The William E. Ervin House is a historic mansion in Columbus, Mississippi, U.S.. It was built in 1836 for William E. Ervin. It has been listed on the National Register of Historic Places since December 1, 1989.

References

Houses on the National Register of Historic Places in Mississippi
Greek Revival houses in Mississippi
Houses completed in 1836
Antebellum architecture
National Register of Historic Places in Lowndes County, Mississippi